Larissa was an ancient Greek city located in Thrace, located in the region between the river Nestos to the river Hebros. Larissa was located in the borderland between Elis and Achaian Dyme. It remains unlocated and unidentified.

See also
Greek colonies in Thrace

References

Greek colonies in Thrace
Former populated places in Greece
Lost cities and towns